S. Daniel Raj was an Indian politician and former Member of the Legislative Assembly. He was elected to the Tamil Nadu legislative assembly as an Indian National Congress candidate from Srivaikuntam constituency in 1984, 1989 and 1991 elections.

References 

Indian National Congress politicians from Tamil Nadu
Living people
Year of birth missing (living people)
Tamil Nadu MLAs 1985–1989
Tamil Nadu MLAs 1991–1996